Live Versions is the first live album by the Australian psychedelic rock band Tame Impala, released on 19 April 2014 (Record Store Day) by Modular Recordings.

Track listing
All songs written by Kevin Parker, except "Apocalypse Dreams", written by Kevin Parker and Jay Watson.

Personnel
 Kevin Parker – vocals, guitar
 Jay Watson – keys, synth, backing vocals
 Dominic Simper – guitar, keys
 Cam Avery – bass
 Julien Barbagallo - drums

References

2014 live albums
Tame Impala live albums
Modular Recordings live albums
Albums produced by Kevin Parker